V. Cheluvaraj (born 5 September 1986) is an Indian first-class cricketer who plays for Railways. He made his Twenty20 debut on 3 January 2016 in the 2015–16 Syed Mushtaq Ali Trophy.

References

External links
 

1986 births
Living people
Indian cricketers
Railways cricketers
Cricketers from Bangalore